North Thompson Oxbows East Provincial Park is a provincial park in Thompson-Nicola Regional District in the Interior region of British Columbia, Canada. It "…protects a stretch of wide meandering river system with a high level of diversity in a very productive part of the upper North Thompson River lowlands", as well as "…patches of old growth hybrid spruce and subalpine fir." There are no camping or day-use facilities.

References

External links

Provincial parks of British Columbia
Thompson Country
1996 establishments in British Columbia
Protected areas established in 1996